The Journal of Thoracic and Cardiovascular Surgery is a monthly peer-reviewed medical journal covering cardiothoracic surgery, cardiology, pulmonary medicine, and vascular disease published by Elsevier. It is the official journal of the American Association for Thoracic Surgery and the Western Thoracic Surgical Association.

History and Impact
The journal was established in 1931 as the Journal of Thoracic Surgery. The journal has the second highest impact factor of all cardiothoracic surgery journals. According to the Journal Citation Reports, its 2020 impact factor is 5.209, ranking it 21st out of 212 journals in the category "Surgery".

References

External links
 
 Journal page at publisher's website

Elsevier academic journals
Cardiology journals
Surgery journals
Pulmonology journals
Monthly journals
Publications established in 1931
English-language journals